John Linnell may refer to

 John Linnell (born 1959), American musician
 John Linnell (painter) (1792–1882), English landscape and portrait painter
 John Linnell (cabinet maker) (1729–1796), 18th-century English cabinet maker

See also
 John Wycliffe Linnell, British physician
 John Linnell Bond, architect